Division 8 is the tenth and lowest level in the league system of Swedish football and comprises 6 sections with 7 to 9 football teams in each. The top team in each Division 8 group is promoted to Division 7 and the second placed teams may also be promoted or participate in the promotion/relegation play-offs.

Administration
The District Football Associations are responsible for the administration of Division 8. The Swedish Football Association is responsible for the administration of Division 3 and the higher tiers of the Swedish football league system.

References 

Ten